Tim Gullikson and Tom Gullikson were the defending champions but lost in the semifinals to Rod Frawley and Geoff Masters.

Frawley and Masters won the doubles title at the 1980 Queen's Club Championships tennis tournament defeating Paul McNamee and Sherwood Stewart in the final 6–2, 4–6, 11–9.

Seeds

Draw

Final

Top half

Bottom half

References

External links
 Official website Queen's Club Championships 
 ATP tournament profile

Doubles